Bladworth is a village in the Canadian province of Saskatchewan within the Rural Municipality of McCraney No. 282 and Census Division No. 11.

History 

Bladworth incorporated as a village on July 27, 1906.

Heritage properties
Bladworth is the site of a Saskatchewan Municipal Heritage property, a two-story brick house clearly visible from adjacent Highway 11. The J. Fred Johnston house is named for its builder, a Saskatchewan entrepreneur, Liberal Member of Parliament and later a Senator, from 1943 to 1948. The home is now owned by Barkley and Tannis Prpick, proprietors of the local public house. Mr. Prpick is a noted local figure and third generation "Bladworthian".

Demographics 

Notable people 
Greg Brkich (born 1958), politician
Gordon Stewart Northcott (1906-1930), serial killer and rapist
Rod Sarich (born 1981), ice hockey player

See also 
 Wineville Chicken Coop Murders
 List of communities in Saskatchewan
 Villages of Saskatchewan

References 

Villages in Saskatchewan
McCraney No. 282, Saskatchewan
Division No. 11, Saskatchewan